Shunyo Awnko (English: The Zero Act) is a 2013 Bengali film directed by Goutam Ghose. The film stars Soumitra Chatterjee, Konkona Sen Sharma and Priyanshu Chatterjee in lead roles. In the film, Konkona Sen Sharma reportedly plays the role of a journalist and Priyanshu Chatterjee as a corporate officer.

Cast
 Soumitra Chatterjee as Murphy
 Konkona Sen Sharma as Raka
 Priyanshu Chatterjee as Agni Bose
 Lolita Chatterjee as Laila
 Priyanka Bose as Jhilik Bose

Soundtrack
 "Alap" (Tori) by Ustad Rashid Khan
 "Title Music"
 "Dhusor Chul" by Rupankar Bagchi
 "Hridoy Amar Nache Re" by Kaushiki Chakrabarty
 "Rabso Neha Laga" (Bilawal Bandish) by Pandit Ajoy Chakrabarty and Kaushiki Chakrabarty
 "Aloy Alokmoy Kore" by Kaushiki Chakrabarty
 "Bibhotso Moja" by Anupam Roy
 "Emoni Borosha Chilo Se Din" by Kaushiki Chakrabarty
 "Alap" (Sindhu Bhairavi) by Ustad Rashid Khan

References

External links 
 

Bengali-language Indian films
2010s Bengali-language films
2013 films
Films directed by Goutam Ghose